Estadio Winston Pineda is a soccer stadium in Jutiapa, Guatemala. The stadium, also known as "El Cóndor", It opened in 1982 and is home to Liga Nacional club Achuapa and has a maximum capacity of 6,000 people.

Winston Pineda